C. nivalis may refer to:
 Caladenia nivalis, an orchid species in the genus Caladenia
 Cardiocondyla nivalis, an ant species in the genus Cardiocondyla
 Cetraria nivalis, a lichen species found on Severnaya Zemlya
 Chionomys nivalis, a rodent species
 Chlamydomonas nivalis, a green alga species

 Cotoneaster nivalis, a woody plant species
 Cryphoeca nivalis, a spider species